Tony Clegg (born 8 November 1965) is an English former professional footballer who played as a central defender for Bradford City and York City, making 89 appearances in the Football League. He later played non-league football for Chorley. Whilst at Bradford, he won the Football League Division Three title in 1984–85. On the last day of that successful season his day was to turn into a nightmare when 56 spectators were killed in a horrendous stand fire while playing Lincoln City.

After retiring as a player, Clegg moved to Maidstone, and worked in insurance.

References

1965 births
Living people
People from Keighley
English footballers
Association football central defenders
Bradford City A.F.C. players
York City F.C. players
Chorley F.C. players
English Football League players